Miloš Trailović (born September 15, 1981) is a Serbian former professional basketball player.

References

External links
 Eurobasket profile
 RealGM profile
 Proballers profile
 FIBA Profile

1981 births
Living people
Basketball League of Serbia players
KK Ergonom players
OKK Konstantin players
KK MZT Skopje players
KK Hemofarm players
KK Napredak Aleksinac players
KK Prokuplje players
Serbian men's basketball players
Serbian expatriate basketball people in North Macedonia
Basketball players from Niš
Guards (basketball)